The Toys That Built America is a multi-part documentary series that showcases Parker Brothers, Milton Bradley and Ruth Handler who were visionaries that transformed Mattel, a small toy company, into a multi-billion dollar empire.

Episodes

Season 1 

 Masters of Invention
 Clash of the Toy Titans
 Toy Car Wars
 Board Game Empires

Season 2 

 Masters of the Toy Universe
 The Birth of Videogames
 The Idea Man
 Brick by Brick
 Order Out of Chaos
 Cabbage Clash
 80's Tech Toys
 Christmas Crazes
 Gross Out Icons
 Plumber vs. Hedgehog

References 

English-language television shows